The 2014–15 Seton Hall Pirates men's basketball team represented Seton Hall University during the 2014–15 NCAA Division I men's basketball season. The Pirates, led by fifth year head coach Kevin Willard, played its home games in Newark, New Jersey at the Prudential Center and were members of the Big East Conference. They finished the season 16–15, 6–12 in Big East play to finish in a tie for seventh place. They lost in the first round of the Big East tournament to Marquette.

Previous season
The Pirates finished the season 17–17, 6–12 in Big East play to finish in eighth place. They advanced to the semifinals of the Big East tournament where they lost to Providence.

Departures

Incoming transfers

Incoming recruits

Roster

Schedule
 
|-
!colspan=9 style="background:#0000FF; color:#D3D3D3;"| Non-Conference Regular Season

|-
!colspan=9 style="background:#0000FF; color:#D3D3D3;"| Big East Conference Play

|-
!colspan=9 style="background:#0000ff; color:#D3D3D3;"| Big East tournament

Rankings

References

Seton Hall
Seton Hall Pirates men's basketball seasons
Seton Hall
Seton Hall